Jussy may refer to several places:

France

 Jussy, Moselle, in the Moselle département
 Jussy, Yonne, in the Yonne département
 Jussy, Aisne, in the Aisne département
 Jussy-Champagne, in the Cher département
 Jussy-le-Chaudrier, in the Cher département
 Pers-Jussy, in the Haute-Savoie département

Switzerland

 Jussy, Switzerland